Syncosmia craspedozona is a moth in the family Geometridae. It is found on Bali, Luzon and Seram.

References

Moths described in 1958
Eupitheciini